Mazie Karen Turner (or Maize Karen Turner) (1954 - 7 June 2014) was an artist from Newcastle, Australia. She worked in photography, sculpture and painting.

She was born in Sydney in 1954 to parents Jim and Zug.

After attending art school, she moved to Wangi Wangi, and had three children with partner Richard Tipping.

She died in 2014. A commemorative sculpture by Tipping, titled Morning (2007) features in the Lake Macquarie City Art Gallery's Sculpture Park.

She was commemorated in a memorial exhibition at Newcastle Art Gallery in September 2017. Turner's work was included in Part II of the Know My Name exhibition at the National Gallery of Australia in 2021-22.

Education and work 
Turner achieved a Bachelor of Fine Arts in printmaking and photography at the South Australian School of Art (1976). She later studied a Master of Arts with honours at the University of Western Sydney (1994). She completed a PhD in fine art at the University of Newcastle (2008).

She lectured and taught fine art at both the University of Newcastle and Hunter TAFE's Newcastle Art School.

Exhibitions

Solo exhibitions 
 Bondi Pavilion, 1982 
 Bitumen River Gallery, ACT, 1983 
 JamFactory, Adelaide, 1983 
 International Gallery, Milan, Italy, 1984 
 Sommerville College, Oxford, UK, 1986 
 Salience (A Silience). Paintings by Ma/ze Turner, 3 June - 5 July 1997 
 maize k turner: resilience, Gitte Weise Gallery, 28 July - 22 August 1998 
 Mazie K. Turner: Oves, Gitte Weise Gallery, 22 November - 17 December 2000 
 Mazie Turner: Colour Sweeps Over Dark Grounds, Gitte Weise Gallery, 30 April - 31 May 2003
 Mazie Karen Turner: Between dream and earth, Newcastle Art Gallery, 2 September - 5 November 2017 
 The Art of Maizie Turner, Moree Plains Gallery, 1 June - 31 August 2013

Group exhibitions 
 Holdsworth Galleries, 1987 
 King St. Gallery, 1988 
 Nexus Nightclub, Newcastle, 1989 
 Newcastle Contemporary Gallery, 1990 
 Greenhill Galleries, Adelaide, 1991 
 Jan Taylor Gallery, Sydney, 1991 
 Lake's Edge Festival, Lake Macquarie, 9 November 2003 
 Pandora's Box, Newcastle Art Space, August - September 2006
 Down Under Ground, Wieliczka Salt Mine, Drozdowice Chamber, Poland, July - September 2008
 Hothouse (staff exhibition), Newcastle Art School, 2012
 Out of the Blue: Celebrating 175 years of the cyanotype, Photospace School of Art & Design, ANU, 13–25 August 2017

Reviews 
 Mazie Turner at the John Paynter Gallery by Helen Hopcroft

Public collections 
Turner's work is held in public collections including:
 Newcastle Art Gallery
 The University of Newcastle
 Artbank 
 The Australian National University
 The Art Gallery of New South Wales
 The National Gallery of Victoria
 Works listed under Karen Turner:
 Desert She Oak trees, passing, maturing, into the night, Papunya, 1981-1982
 Painting with Tutama and the children came to visit, the evening drawn, Papunya, 1981-1982
 The National Gallery of Australia 
 Works listed under Mazie Karen Turner:
 Merry Christmas Oxford St., 1979
 No title. (animal park with billboard), 1979

References

External links 
Mazie Turner website
Record for Artist file at The Shaw Research Library, National Gallery of Victoria
Record in Australian Art Obituaries Index

Australian artists
1954 births
2014 deaths